The 2014–15 Ole Miss Rebels men's basketball team represented the University of Mississippi in the 2014–15 NCAA Division I men's basketball season. The team's head coach was Andy Kennedy, in his ninth season at Ole Miss. The team played their home games at the Tad Smith Coliseum in Oxford, Mississippi as a member of the Southeastern Conference. They finished the season 21–13, 11–7 in SEC play to finish in four-way tie for third place. They lost in the second round of the SEC tournament to South Carolina. They received an at-large bid to the NCAA tournament where they defeated BYU in the First Four before losing in the second round to Xavier.

Before the season

Departures

Incoming Transfers

Recruits

Season

Preseason

Roster

Schedule and results

|-
!colspan=9 style="background:#; color:white;"| Exhibition

|-
!colspan=9 style="background:#; color:white;"| Non-conference games

|-
!colspan=9 style="background:#; color:white;"| Conference games

|-
!colspan=9 style="background:#; color:white;"| SEC tournament

|-
!colspan=9 style="background:#; color:white;"| NCAA tournament

See also
2014–15 Ole Miss Rebels women's basketball team

References

Ole Miss Rebels men's basketball seasons
Ole Miss
Ole Miss Rebels men's basketball team
Ole Miss Rebels men's basketball team
Ole Miss